Gouqi jiu can refer to several varieties of Chinese alcoholic beverage containing goji.

Variations 
There are three distinct kinds of gouqi jiu: distilled, fermented, and those produced by steeping goji (wolfberries) in other types of alcoholic drink. There is also a beer made from wolfberries.

History 
Gouqi jiu has a long history in China. It was recorded in Han Dynasty records.

References

See also 
 Baijiu
 Huangjiu

Chinese alcoholic drinks
Chinese distilled drinks
Fermented drinks
Fruit wines
Lycium